Ferrini is an Italian surname, and may refer to:

 Francesco Ferrini, Italian footballer (born 1985)
 Franco Ferrini, Italian screenwriter (born 1944)
 Giorgio Ferrini, Italian football manager (1939–1976)
 Giovanni Battista Ferrini, Italian composer (1601–1674)
 Henry Ferrini, American non-fiction filmmaker (born 1953)
 Vincent Ferrini, American writer and poet (1913–2007)